Oulainen railway station is located in the center of the town of Oulainen, Northern Ostrobothnia, Finland. It was opened in 1886.

Railway stations in North Ostrobothnia
Railway stations opened in 1886